The 1992 Giro d'Italia was the 75th edition of the Giro d'Italia, one of cycling's Grand Tours. The Giro began in Genoa, with an individual time trial on 24 May, and Stage 12 occurred on 4 June with a stage from Imola. The race finished in Milan on 14 June.

Stage 12
4 June 1992 — Imola to Bassano del Grappa,

Stage 13
5 June 1992 — Bassano del Grappa to Corvara,

Stage 14
6 June 1992 — Corvara to Monte Bondone,

Stage 15
7 June 1992 — Riva del Garda to Palazzolo sull'Oglio,

Stage 16
8 June 1992 — Palazzolo sull'Oglio to Sondrio,

Stage 17
9 June 1992 — Sondrio to Vercelli,

Stage 18

Stage 19
11 June 1992 — Saluzzo to Pila,

Stage 20
12 June 1992 — Saint Vincent to Verbania,

Stage 21
13 June 1992 — Verbania to Vigevano,

Stage 22
14 June 1992 — Vigevano to Milan,  (ITT)

References

1992 Giro d'Italia
Giro d'Italia stages